The Tizguit Valley is a river-cut landform in the Middle Atlas mountain range, in the Fès-Meknès region of Morocco.

Much of the valley is characterised by basaltic rock. This valley is associated with forested areas that may provide habitat for the endangered Barbary macaque, Macaca sylvanus, a primate that prehistorically had a much wider range in northern Morocco.

References
 C. Michael Hogan. 2008. Barbary Macaque: Macaca sylvanus, Globaltwitcher.com, ed. Nicklas Stromberg
 J.J. Macaire and C. Cocirta. 1994. Basalt Weathering and Fluvial Sedimentary Particles: Comparison of Two Watersheds in the Middle Atlas Mountains, Morocco, Journal of Sedimentary Research. Volume 64a.

Line notes

Valleys of Morocco
Geography of Fès-Meknès
Atlas Mountains